In mathematics, the restricted product is a construction in the theory of topological groups.

 
is the subset of the product of the 's consisting of all elements  such that  for all but finitely many . 

This group is given the topology whose basis of open sets are those of the form
 

One can easily prove that the restricted product is itself a locally compact group. The best known example of this construction is that of the adele ring and idele group of a global field.

See also
Direct sum

References

 
 

Topological groups